"Regina caeli" (Queen of Heaven) is a musical antiphon addressed to the Blessed Virgin Mary that is used in the liturgy of the Roman Rite of the Catholic Church during the Easter season, from Easter Sunday until Pentecost. During this season, it is the Marian antiphon that ends Compline (Night Prayer) and it takes the place of the traditional thrice-daily Angelus prayer.

In the past, the spelling Regina coeli was sometimes used, but this spelling is no longer found in official liturgical books.

Text

The antiphon itself consists of four lines:

Compline, as revised in 1969 after the Second Vatican Council, ends with the antiphon alone. In the earlier Roman Breviary and in recitation at Angelus time during Eastertide, the following versicle (℣) and response (℟) and the following prayer are added to the antiphon:

A verse translation in 7.7.7.7 metre used in some Anglican churches is usually sung to the hymn tune known as Easter Hymn, "Christ the Lord is Risen Today" (Jesus Christ is risen today) or the hymn tune "Ave Virgo Virginum" (Hail Virgin of virgins):

℣. Joy to thee, O Queen of Heaven. Alleluia!
℟. He whom Thou wast meet to bear, Alleluia!
℣. As He promised hath arisen, Alleluia!
℟. Pour for us to God thy prayer. Alleluia!

℣. Rejoice and be glad, O Virgin Mary, alleluia.
℟. For the Lord is risen indeed, alleluia.
Let us pray:
O God, who through the resurrection of Thy Son, our Lord Jesus Christ, didst vouchsafe to give joy to the whole world: grant, we beseech thee, that through His Mother, the Virgin Mary, we may obtain the joys of everlasting life. Through the same Christ our Lord. ℟. Amen.

History

The authorship of "Regina caeli" is unknown. It has been traced back to the 12th century and is found in an antiphonary of c. 1200 now in St Peter's Basilica, Rome. In the first half of the 13th century it was in Franciscan use, after compline.

Jacobus de Voragine's thirteenth-century Golden Legend includes a story that, during a procession with an image of the Blessed Virgin that was held to pray for the ending of a pestilence in Rome, angels were heard singing the first three lines of the "Regina caeli" antiphon, to which Pope Gregory the Great (590−604) thereupon added the fourth, after which he saw atop what in consequence is called the Castel Sant'Angelo a vision of an angel sheathing his sword, thus signifying the cessation of the plague.

Polyphonic settings
As well as the plainsong melodies (a simple and an ornate form) associated with it, the "Regina caeli" has, since the 16th century, often been provided with polyphonic settings. Pierre de Manchicourt's setting was published in 1539. Tomás Luis de Victoria composed a setting for five voices in 1572 and another for eight voices in 1576. Giovanni Pierluigi da Palestrina also composed at least two settings of the antiphon. A setting for four voices by Charles de Courbe dates from 1622, and Lully's motet Regina coeli, laetare dates from 1684. 7 Regina caeli, H 16, H 30, H 31, H 32, H.32 a, H.32 b, H 46, (1670–1680) have been composed by Marc-Antoine Charpentier. There are three settings by the young Mozart (K. 108, K. 127, and K. 276), and one by Brahms (Op. 37 #3).

See also

 Queen of Heaven
 Angelus
 "Alma Redemptoris Mater"
 "Ave Regina caelorum"
 "Salve Regina"

References

External links 
 
 Hugh Henry, "Regina Coeli (Queen of Heaven)" in Catholic Encyclopedia (New York 1911)
 R. J. Snow, "Regina Caeli Laetare" in New Catholic Encyclopedia, via encyclopedia.com

Marian devotions
Roman Catholic prayers
Catholic liturgy
Marian antiphons
Titles of Mary
Latin-language Christian hymns